The 1986–87 Michigan State Spartans men's basketball team represented Michigan State University in the 1986–87 NCAA Division I men's basketball season. The team played their home games at Jenison Field House in East Lansing, Michigan and were members of the Big Ten Conference. They were coached by Jud Heathcote in his 11th year at Michigan State. The Spartans finished with a record of 11–17, 6–12 to finish in seventh place in Big Ten play.

Previous season
The Spartans finished the 1985–86 season with a record of 23–8, 12–6 to finish in third place in Big Ten play. They received an at-large bid to the NCAA Tournament as the No. 5 seed in the Midwest region. There they defeated No. 12-seeded Washington and No. 4-seeded Georgetown to advance to the Sweet Sixteen where they lost to No. 1-seeded Kansas.

Roster and statistics 

Source

Schedule and results

|-
!colspan=9 style=| Non-conference regular season

|-
!colspan=9 style=| Big Ten regular season

References

Michigan State Spartans men's basketball seasons
Michigan State
Michigan State Spartans men's b
Michigan State Spartans men's b